Quraciitallal is a town in the central Hiran region of Somalia.

References
Quracii Tallal

Populated places in Hiran, Somalia